Arne Riberg (23 June 1909 – 3 April 1982) was a Norwegian footballer. He played in one match for the Norway national football team in 1931.

References

External links
 

1909 births
1982 deaths
Norwegian footballers
Norway international footballers
Place of birth missing
Association footballers not categorized by position